Kannada is a Unicode block containing characters for the Kannada, Sanskrit, Konkani, Sankethi, Havyaka, Tulu and Kodava languages. In its original incarnation, the code points U+0C82..U+0CCD were a direct copy of the Kannada characters A2-ED from the 1988 ISCII standard. The Devanagari, Bengali, Gurmukhi, Gujarati, Oriya, Tamil, Telugu, and Malayalam blocks were similarly all based on their ISCII encodings.

Block

History
The following Unicode-related documents record the purpose and process of defining specific characters in the Kannada block:

References 

Unicode blocks